Bargaon or Baragan is a village under Khariar Tahasil in Nuapada district of Odisha state in India. It is situated 10 km away from sub-district headquarter Khariar and 63 km towards south from district headquarter Nuapada. The word "Bargaon" is composed of two words, "Bara" means 'Divine' and "gaan" means 'village'.  On the 150th birth anniversary of Mahatma Gandhi , the village was recognised as "Lok Kala Gram" of Nuapada district by the Dept. Of Language, Literature and Culture, Government of Odisha

Economy
Bargaon is  comes under a rain shadow belt.
It has a weekly bazaar takes place in every
Tuesday. Most people of Bargaon are middle-
class, which includes government
employees like Junior Clerks, School Teachers, Forest Guard, Fireman, Odisha Police, OSAP, SOG Army, Small shopkeepers,
businessmen etc. 

Bank

In 1984, a branch Kalahandi Anchalik Bank was established in the village for improving the economic standards of people. Nowadays, it is known as Utkal Grameen Bank. 

Offices

There are some government offices in the village:
Post Office

Panchayat Office

33KV BARGAON Electrical Sub-Station
Office of the Revenue Inspector (R.I.)

BARGAON Indane Gas
Veterinary and Artificial Breeding Centre
Primary Agriculture Cooperative Society (PACS) Office

Health Care Facilities

Basic health care facilities available in the village. 

Primary Health Centre (PHC)
Primary Health Sub-centre (PHS)
Maternity and Child Welfare Centre (MCW)

BARGAON Digital Hospital & Dispensary

Geography

Bargaon is a village in Nuapada district. It is located at 20.34°N 82.68°E. It has an average elevation of 228m. The village has an area of 505 hectares.

There are few government and private
schools in the village. Odia language is the local language of the people here.

Places of Interest 

 Chakadongar : 
A rounded shaped hills is situated on the eastern part of the village. The NH353 passing through the hill. Maa Chakadongren temple is situated here.

 Teteldongri :  Teteldongri and Uddhlu are another hillside situated on the north side of the village. Below the Teteldongri a pond (called parject) is situated and a minor canal is passing nearby. 
 Dadhibaman Pokhari :   A pond is situated on the north east part of the village. The people of Bargaon use it for daily bath. Maa Bandhgosen temple is situated at the centre of the pond.
 Sundar River

The SUNDAR is one of the main tributaries of the Tel River which flows into the Mahanadi. It is  perennial and effluent in nature and maintain sluggish flow during peak summer months. It is also called as The Indra River in several places. Lower Indra Dam or Tikhali Dam is constructed in this river just before 5Km from BARGAON.

Most of the people of BARGAON and nearby villages are depend upon this river for bath as well as for drink.

How to Reach 
The village is well connected with roads to many town. National Highway 353 passing near the village which lead to many cities such as Raipur, Mahasamund,  Khariar Road, Nuapada,  Bhawanipatna, Rayagada etc.

The nearest Railway Station is Kantabanji(40 km) and nearest Railway Junction is Titlagarh which is 60 km away from Bargaon whereas nearest airport located is at Raipur (170 km) in Chhattisgarh.

Demographics
The village has around a 5000 population. Average Sex Ratio of Bargaon village is 968 which is lower than Odisha state average of 979. Child Sex Ratio for
the Bargaon as per census is 1045, higher than Orissa average of 941. 
Bargaon village has lower literacy rate compared to Odisha. In 2011, literacy rate of Bargaon village was 67.41 %
compared to 72.87 % of Odisha. In Bargaon Male literacy stands at 79.47 % while female literacy rate was 54.81 %.

Education

Nursery Education
There are several Anganwadi Centre functioning in Bargaon for all round development of the children.

 Anganwadi Centre -1
 Anganwadi Centre -2
 Anganwadi Centre -3
 Anganwadi Centre -4
Anganwadi Centre-5

Primary Education

Primary Education play an important role for the development of children in all aspects. However, the primary education have been working in the village since 1918.

Bargaon Centre Primary School is one of the oldest school of undivided Kalahandi district.

The school has celebrated it centenary in the month of December, 2018.

 
 
 

Centre Primary School : The school was established in 1918. It is situated at the centre of the village. About 102 batches successfully passed from this school.  

Sabarpada Project Primary School : The school was established in 2002 under the Project of District Primary Education Programme (DPEP), Govt. Of Odisha.
Kamajori Project Primary School : The school was established in 2007 and is managed by Dept. Of School & Mass Education, Govt. Of Odisha.
Bendrabahal Primary School : Bendrabahal Primary School was established in 1966 on the right side of the main road to Bargaon.
 
English M Public School, Bargaon
Bargaon U.P./ M.E. School, Bargaon : Bargaon Upper Primary School was established in 1957 is managed by the Dept. Of School and Mass Education, Govt. Of Odisha.  Odia is the medium of instruction in the school. The school has a well building and has a library.  In the year 2017 the school was merged with the Jai Kishan High School, Bargaon.

Secondary Education

For Secondary Education, there's a Nodal High School namely,

 Jai Kishan High School, Bargaon It was established in 1972 by the people of Bargaon. The founder of the school collect some money, land and established the school for the development of local communities and to educate them. Later on the Government of Odisha taken over the responsibility of the school. 
Nowadays the school is considered as a nodal school in the district. It provides education to both boys and girls from class 6th to class 10th. Both Junior Red Cross (JRC) and Scouts & Guides are functioning in the school.

Religious Place

There are 4 Shiv temple in the village.
Besides these there are some Devi mandir also present in the village. Maa Chakadongren, Maa Bandhgosen is worshipped as the Village devi.

Festivals and rituals
 
Many festivals are celebrated in the village. These include:

Durga Puja :It is one of the most remarkable major festival or Puja celebrated in the village every year. The festival is observed in the month Ashwina, every year. For the first time, it was starts in the year 1982 and continue celebrated.
Shivaratri :It is one of the another festival celebrated in Bargaon every year. It celebrates in Honor of Lord Shiva. According to the fact, it has been celebrating in the village since 1990.
Shri Shri Basant Madhumangal Raasleela :
 The most important festival is Raasleela, celebrated every year in the month January or February. It is the festival of Shri Krishna, celebrated for eight days. Some children and some Adults play the role of different characters such as Krishna, Balaram, Madhumangal, Sudam, Subal, King, Dashi, and Shakhi. Kokolila' is the most popular night of Raasleela, it is generally celebrated in the third night of the festival. Since 1889, it was celebrated every year in the village. 

Some other national and regional festivals are also celebrated in the village. They include Holi, Diwali, Nuakhai, Puspuni, Ganesha Puja, and Gaja Laxmi Puja.

References 

 Schools in Bargaon : https://schools.org.in/orissa/nuapada/khariar/podapali-p.u.p.s
 Rain Falls in Bargaon : http://www.fallingrain.com/world/IN/21/Bargaon2.html
Postal Information : https://www.postofficeinfo.com/238646/bargaon-post-office-pincode-766107-in-khariar-nuapada-odisha/
 Sarapanch of Bargaon : https://odishapanchayat.gov.in/English/Pdf/NUAPADA.pdf
 Bargaon, Census Report 2011 : https://www.census2011.co.in/data/village/421959-bargaon-orissa.html

Nuapada district